NGC 1084 is an unbarred spiral galaxy in the constellation Eridanus. It is located at a distance of about 63 million light-years away from the Milky Way. The galaxy was discovered by William Herschel on 10 January 1785. It has multiple spiral arms, which are not well defined. It belongs in the same galaxy group with NGC 988, NGC 991, NGC 1022, NGC 1035, NGC 1042, NGC 1047, NGC 1052 and NGC 1110. This group is in turn associated with the Messier 77 group.

Star formation in the galaxy is chaotic and not confined to the spiral arms, but the rate is not high enough to classify it as a starburst galaxy. Star formation has taken place in small bursts in the last 40 million years. The cause of this activity has been proposed as a merger with a gas-rich dwarf galaxy. A radio source has been detected 3.5' south-west of the galaxy, connected to it by a bridge. NGC 1084 has been the site of 5 supernovae explosions over a period of 49 years: SN 1963P (mag. 14), SN 1996an (Type II, mag. 14), SN 1998dl (Type II, mag. 16), SN 2009H (Type II, mag. 17), and SN 2012ec (Type IIP, mag. 14,5).

Gallery

References

External links 
 

Unbarred spiral galaxies
Eridanus (constellation)
1084
10464